Falke Markt Schwaben is a German association football club from the city of Markt Schwaben, Bavaria. Falke is the German word for falcon, with the animal being depicted in the Coats of arms of Markt Schwaben.

History
The club was formed in 1930 through the merger of predecessor sides Ballspiel-Club Markt Schwaben and Deutsche Jugendkraft Markt Schwaben.  In the aftermath of World War II the club briefly disappeared when occupying Allied authorities banned organizations across the country, including sports and football clubs, as part of the process of denazification, before being reestablished on 4 November 1945. In 1967, team won its first title and gained promotion to the Landesliga Bayern-Süd where they played for seven seasons before being sent down.

Falke reappeared in Landesliga (V) play in 2001, having spent the previous nine seasons in the Bezirksoberliga Oberbayern, and immediately captured the championship there. They moved up to the Oberliga Bayern (IV) where they played two seasons.

After a 17th place Landesliga (VI) finish in 2011, the team slipped to play in the Bezirksoberliga Oberbayern (VII). At the end of the 2011–12 season the club qualified directly for the newly expanded Landesliga after finishing fourth in the Bezirksoberliga. After two seasons in the Landesliga the club was relegated in 2014, opting to withdraw to the tier nine Kreisklasse where its reserve team played rather than to play in the Bezirksliga.

After two seasons at Kreisklasse level a league championship in 2015–16 took the club back up to the Kreisliga.

Honours
The club's honours:

League
 Landesliga Bayern-Süd
 Champions: 2001
 Bezirksoberliga Oberbayern
 Runners-up: 2000
 Bezirksliga Oberbayern-Ost
 Champions: 1967, 1991
 Kreisklasse München 6
 Champions: 2016

Recent managers
Recent managers of the club:

Recent seasons
The recent season-by-season performance of the club:

With the introduction of the Bezirksoberligas in 1988 as the new fifth tier, below the Landesligas, all leagues below dropped one tier. With the introduction of the Regionalligas in 1994 and the 3. Liga in 2008 as the new third tier, below the 2. Bundesliga, all leagues below dropped one tier. With the establishment of the Regionalliga Bayern as the new fourth tier in Bavaria in 2012 the Bayernliga was split into a northern and a southern division, the number of Landesligas expanded from three to five and the Bezirksoberligas abolished. All leagues from the Bezirksligas onwards were elevated one tier.

Stadium
The team plays its matches in the Parkstadion, which has a capacity of 5,000.

References

External links
 Official team site  
 Falke Markt Schwaben at Weltfussball.de  
 Das deutsche Fußball-Archiv  historical German domestic league tables
 Manfreds Fussball Archiv  Tables and results from the Bavarian amateur leagues

Football clubs in Germany
Football clubs in Bavaria
Football in Upper Bavaria
Association football clubs established in 1930
1930 establishments in Germany
Ebersberg (district)